Audrey Parra (born 16 November 1987) is a French rugby union player. She represented  at the 2010 Women's Rugby World Cup.

References

1987 births
Living people
French female rugby union players
Female rugby sevens players